The 2020–21 season was Società Sportiva Calcio Napoli's 75th season in Serie A. Besides the Serie A, the club competed in Italy's main domestic cup competition, the Coppa Italia, as well as the UEFA Europa League and the Supercoppa Italiana as winners of the 2019–20 Coppa Italia.

Players

Squad information
Last updated on 7 October 2020

Transfers

In

Loans in

Out

Loans out

Pre-season and friendlies

Competitions

Overview

Serie A

League table

Results summary

Results by round

Matches
The league fixtures were announced on 2 September 2020.

Coppa Italia

Supercoppa Italiana

Background
The 2020 Supercoppa Italiana was the fourth time Napoli took part in the competition, having already participated as Serie A champions once (1990) and as Coppa Italia winners twice (2012 and 2014). Napoli won two of the previous three editions in which they played.

UEFA Europa League

Group stage

The group stage draw was held on 2 October 2020.

Knockout phase

Round of 32
The draw for the round of 32 was held on 14 December 2020.

Statistics

Appearances and goals

|-
! colspan=14 style="background:#5DAFE3; color:#FFFFFF; text-align:center"| Goalkeepers

|-
! colspan=14 style="background:#5DAFE3; color:#FFFFFF; text-align:center"| Defenders

|-
! colspan=14 style="background:#5DAFE3; color:#FFFFFF; text-align:center"| Midfielders

|-
! colspan=14 style="background:#5DAFE3; color:#FFFFFF; text-align:center"| Forwards

|-
! colspan=14 style="background:#5DAFE3; color:#FFFFFF; text-align:center"| Players transferred out during the season

Goalscorers

Notes

References

S.S.C. Napoli seasons
Napoli
Napoli